Deghdzavan is a village in the Noyemberyan Municipality of the Tavush Province of Armenia.

History 
Established in 1973, Deghdzavan was initially incorporated within the Archis region of Noyemberyan.

References

External links 

The Armenia Fund Rural Development Program - Deghdzavan: Tavush

Populated places in Tavush Province